The Huckleberry Mountain Fire Overlook is a fire lookout station in northern Bridger–Teton National Forest. The rustic two-story log structure was built in 1938 by the Civilian Conservation Corps to a standard U.S. Forest Service design. The lookout was used for fire surveillance until 1957.

References

External links
Grand Teton Historic Resource Study: Conservationists National Park Service
Huckleberry Mountain Fire Lookout at the Wyoming State Historic Preservation Office

Government buildings completed in 1938
Towers completed in 1938
Fire lookout towers in Wyoming
Fire lookout towers on the National Register of Historic Places
Buildings and structures in Teton County, Wyoming
Park buildings and structures on the National Register of Historic Places in Wyoming
Rustic architecture in Wyoming
Civilian Conservation Corps in Wyoming
National Register of Historic Places in Teton County, Wyoming
1938 establishments in Wyoming